FC Hoyvík is a Faroese  football club founded in 2012 after the merger of FF Giza and the original FC Hoyvík. Initially it was known as Giza Hoyvík but was renamed to FC Hoyvík after 2018 season and since 2019 was known as FC Hoyvík. The club is based in Hoyvík, and play their home matches in Hoyvíksvøllur.

History

In their first season, they played in 2. deild and finished 3rd losing the promotion on goal difference. In 2013 and 2014 they finished 3rd again, finally achieving promotion to the second tier in 2015. They spent three seasons in 1. deild, being relegated back to 2. deild in 2018. After the end of the 2018 season, the club announced it would be renamed to FC Hoyvík.

The club played its home matches in Gundadalur's second field until June 2017, when Hoyvíksvøllur (also called J&K vøllur because of sponsorship reasons) was opened. Its first match in the new field was a 4–1 win against TB/FCS/Royn II.

Performances

Honours
2. deild: 2019

Current squad

References

External links
Official website

Football clubs in the Faroe Islands
Association football clubs established in 2012
2012 establishments in the Faroe Islands